Vitali Eduardovich Kishchenko (born May 25, 1964) is a Soviet and Russian actor. He was awarded the Merited Artist of the Russian Federation in 2005. Vitali appeared in more than 70 films.

Biography
Vitali Kishchenko was born in Krasnoyarsk, Russian SFSR, Soviet Union. He studied at the Krasnoyarsk State Institute of Arts, after which he worked at the Krasnoyarsk State Theater for Young Spectators, the Kaliningrad Regional Drama Theater, the Omsk State Academic Drama Theater and the Kaliningrad Regional Youth Theater Molodezhny. Since 2003, Vitaly has been actively acting in films.

Selected filmography

References

External links 
 Vitali Kishchenko on kino-teatr.ru

1964 births
Living people
Actors from Krasnoyarsk
Soviet male actors
Soviet male stage actors
Russian male film actors
Russian male television actors
Russian male stage actors
Honored Artists of the Russian Federation
20th-century Russian male actors
21st-century Russian male actors